The Military ranks of Ghana are the military insignia used by the Ghana Armed Forces. Being a former colony of the United Kingdom, Ghana shares a rank structure similar to that of the United Kingdom.

Current ranks

Commissioned officer ranks
The rank insignia of commissioned officers.

Other ranks
The rank insignia of non-commissioned officers and enlisted personnel.

Former ranks

Notes

References

External links
 

Ghana and the Commonwealth of Nations
Ghana
Military of Ghana